Böhnecke Glacier is a steep glacier  wide, which flows southeast to the northwest side of Violante Inlet, on the east coast of Palmer Land. It was discovered and photographed from the air in December 1940 by members of the United States Antarctic Service. During 1947 the glacier was photographed from the air by members of the Ronne Antarctic Research Expedition under Finn Ronne, who in conjunction with the Falkland Islands Dependencies Survey (FIDS) charted it from the ground. It was named by FIDS for Gunther Böhnecke, a German oceanographer and a member of the German expedition in the Meteor, 1925–27.

References 

Glaciers of Palmer Land